The Hasenmatt is a mountain of the Jura range, located north of Grenchen and Solothurn in the Swiss canton of Solothurn. Reaching a height of 1,445 metres above sea level, it is the highest summit in the canton of Solothurn. The Hasenmatt is also the easternmost summit above 1,400 metres of the Jura Mountains.

The summit of the Hasenmatt can be easily reached by several trails and a road culminating at 1,318 metres.

See also
List of mountains of Switzerland
List of most isolated mountains of Switzerland

References

External links
Hasenmatt on Hikr

Mountains of Switzerland
Highest points of Swiss cantons
Mountains of the Jura
Mountains of the canton of Solothurn
One-thousanders of Switzerland